Hans Bronsart von Schellendorf (11 February 18303 November 1913) was a classical musician and composer who studied under Franz Liszt.

Biography
Hans Bronsart von Schellendorf (also called Hans von Bronsart) was born into a Prussian military family, and educated at Berlin University. He studied piano with Adolph Jullack. He went to Weimar in 1853 where he met Franz Liszt and became familiar with all the musicians in Liszt's circle at the time, including Hector Berlioz and Johannes Brahms. It is a measure of his close relationship with Liszt that it was he who played the solo part in the first Weimar performance of Liszt's 2nd Piano Concerto, with the composer conducting. When the concerto was published, Liszt dedicated it to Bronsart. After having trained for several years with Liszt, he worked as a conductor in Leipzig and Berlin, and then took the post of general manager of the Royal Theatre in Hanover from 1867 to 1887. He held a similar post in Weimar from 1887 until his retirement in 1895.

He met his second wife Ingeborg Bronsart von Schellendorf (née Ingeborg Lena Starck) (1840–1913), also a composer, in Weimar. They married in 1861.

Bronsart von Schellendorff died in Munich in 1913.

Compositions
Bronsart von Schellendorf's compositions include
 Piano Trio in G minor, Op. 1
 Piano Concerto in F-sharp minor, Op. 10
 Symphony No. 1 In die Alpen for choir and orchestra (lost)
 Symphony No. 2 Schicksalsgewalten (lost)
 Fruhlings-Fantasie for orchestra
 Christnacht, cantata
 Der Corsar, opera
 String Sextet
 solo piano pieces.

His piano concerto was much favoured by Hans von Bülow, who rated the work as the "most significant one of the so-called Weimar school". It was recorded in 1973 by Michael Ponti, and in 2017 by Emmanuel Despax for Hyperion.

Both Bronsart and his wife receive many mentions in Liszt's letters. Liszt clearly held their compositions in high regard. In a letter of 12 May 1879, to Walter Bache, he writes "On 5th June Bülow conducts the first concert there, at which Bronsart's beautiful and valuable Fruhlings-Fantasie, Bülow's music to Shakespeare's Julius Caesar, and my Faust Symphony will be performed."

References

 Walker, Alan. Franz Liszt, the Weimar Years: 1848–1861. Ithaca: Cornell University Press softcover. 1993 revision of a 1989 original pub. . (Bronsart is mentioned a number of times, Starck-Bronsart on p. 187.)
 Adelslexikon Vol. II, in: Genealogisches Handbuch des Adels, Vol. 58 of all, C. A. Starke Verlag, Limburg an der Lahn (Germany) 1974, 
 Liszt's letters covering this period with many references to the Bronsarts at Project Gutenberg

External links
 

1830 births
1913 deaths
19th-century classical composers
19th-century German composers
19th-century classical pianists
19th-century German male musicians
20th-century classical composers
20th-century German composers
20th-century German conductors (music)
20th-century German male musicians
German Romantic composers
German male classical composers
German classical pianists
German male conductors (music)
German pianists
German male pianists
Male classical pianists
Pupils of Franz Liszt